Empis lucida is a species of fly in the family Empididae. It is included in the subgenus Anacrostichus. It is found in the  Palearctic . It is a large (8–10 mm.) shining black species.

References

External links
Images representing Empis at BOLD

Empis
Insects described in 1838
Asilomorph flies of Europe